Oligodon mouhoti, also known as the Cambodian kukri snake or Mouhot's kukri snake, is a species of snake of the family Colubridae. It was named for French naturalist Henri Mouhot.

The snake is found in Cambodia and Thailand and possibly in southern Vietnam and Laos.

References 

mouhoti
Snakes of Southeast Asia
Reptiles of Vietnam
Reptiles of Thailand
Reptiles of Cambodia
Reptiles described in 1914
Taxa named by George Albert Boulenger